Fernão Carvalho was the 4th Captain-major of Portuguese Ceylon. Carvalho was appointed in 1553 under John III of Portugal, he was Captain-major until 1555. He was succeeded by Afonso Pereira de Lacerda.

References

Captain-majors of Ceilão
16th-century Portuguese people